John Lewis (born 19 January 1943) is a Canadian weightlifter. He competed in the men's middle heavyweight event at the 1964 Summer Olympics.

References

1943 births
Living people
Canadian male weightlifters
Olympic weightlifters of Canada
Weightlifters at the 1964 Summer Olympics
Place of birth missing (living people)
Pan American Games medalists in weightlifting
Pan American Games bronze medalists for Canada
Weightlifters at the 1963 Pan American Games
20th-century Canadian people
21st-century Canadian people